Pwo polymerase is a thermostable DNA polymerase used for the polymerase chain reaction. The abbreviation stands for Pyrococcus woesei, a thermophilic archaeon, from which this polymerase was isolated. This polymerase breaks when reaching erroneous uracil in DNA from the chain extension and, through this readahead function, fewer defective DNA clones are synthesized. It is used much less than the usual Taq or Pfu polymerases. This DNA polymerase, similar to other DNA polymerases from Archaebacteria is sensitive to Uracil residues in DNA and is strongly inhibited by dUTP or uracil residues in DNA.  Other polymerases in this class are Pfu, Vent , Deep Vent and Pfx. The inhibition of this class of thermostable DNA polymerases limit their use in some applications of PCR, i.e. use of dUTP for prevention of carryover contamination as well as application involving dU containing primers such as ligase free cloning methods or site directed mutagenesis using UNG.

References 

DNA replication
EC 2.7.7
Polymerase chain reaction